Bőny SE-Royal Plast is a football club based in Bőny, Győr-Moson-Sopron County, Hungary, that competes in the Győr-Moson-Sopron county league.

Name changes
? –1992: Bőnyrétalap
1992 : Bőny and Rétalap villages split up
1992–2021: Bőny SE
2021–present: Bőny SE-Royal Plast

External links
 Profile on Magyar Futball

References

Football clubs in Hungary
Association football clubs established in 1957
1957 establishments in Hungary